Marbled scorpion may refer to various Australian scorpions, including:
 Lychas marmoreus, the little marbled scorpion
 Lychas variatus, the splendid marbled scorpion